Alliku is a village in Saue Parish, Harju County in northern Estonia. 

Padula railway station on the Elron western route is located there.

References

Villages in Harju County